Ben Brodin is a music producer, recording and mix engineer, composer, and multi-instrumentalist from Omaha, Nebraska. He is a member of several bands, including Mal Madrigal, McCarthy Trenching, Our Fox and The Mynabirds, and has performed both live and in the studio with artists such as Conor Oberst and First Aid Kit. Brodin is a recording engineer at ARC Studios, formerly Presto! Recording Studios, and his own Hand Branch Studio.

Discography

Cat Piss - Cat Piss Rides Again (2022, Mishap Records) -recording and mix engineer
Simon Joyner - Songs From A Stolen Guitar (2022, Grapefruit Records, BB*ISLAND) -recording engineer, B3, Wurlitzer, vibraphone
Little Brazil - Just Leave (2022, Max Trax) -production, recording and mix engineer, bassVI, B3
Seahaven - Halo DLX (2022, Pure Noise Records) -recording and mix engineer
Megan Siebe - Swaying Steady (2021, Grapefruit Records) -production, recording and mix engineer, drums, bass, B3, Wurlitzer, piano, electric guitar, percussion
Dream Regime - Figures In The Clouds (2021, Self) -mix engineer
Danni Lee - Truth Teller (2021, Self) -production, instrumentation, recording and mix engineer
Noah James Gose - Monowi (2021, Self) -recording and mix engineer
Justin Carter - Colossus Drift (2021, Self) -recording and mix engineer
Tom Kutilek - Beginner's Luck (2020, Self) -recording and mix engineer, B3
Seahaven - Halo of Hurt (2020, Pure Noise Records) -recording engineer
Staffers - In The Pigeon Hole (2020, Ever/Never) -mix engineer
Stavro - Akoma: Songs For Greek America (2020, Toyroom) -recording and mix engineer, production
Owen Meany's Batting Stance - Featherweights (2020, LHM) -mix engineer
Ben Eisenberger - Soloists (2020, Plastic Miracles) -mix engineer'
Jim Schroeder - Mesa Buoy (2020, Self) -recording and mix engineerJohn Laughlin - Ten Years, Linked In (2020, Self) -recording and mix engineer, B3The Wandering Hearts - Over Your Body (2020, Decca Records) -keyboardsThe Bruces - The Bruces (2020, Unread Records) -mix engineerThe Lowest Pair - The Perfect Plan (2020, Team Love Records) -piano, B3, Wurlitzer, MellotronAvi Kaplan - I'll Get By (2020, Fantasy Records) -piano, B3, Wurlitzer, MellotronInDreama - Poison House (single) (2020, Self) -recording engineerBig Nope - Back To You (2020, Self) -recording and mix engineerKyler Daron - A Room Of Painted Glass (2020, Self) -mix engineerField Club - Saint June b/w Another Midnight (2020, Self) -recording and mix engineerEddy Mink - Open Container Heart Surgery (2020, Self) -recording engineerBen Sasso - Carousel (2020, Dolphin Camp) -recording and mix engineer, productionStavro - Chances (2019, Self) -recording and mix engineer, productionAvi Kaplan - Aberdeen (single) (2019, Self) -piano, keyboardsJames VanDeuson - Dilation (2019, Self) -recording and mix engineer, production, drums, bass, keyboards, guitarsHussies - Fast (2019, Self) -recording and mix engineerBazile Mills - Holiday (2019, Self) -recording and mix engineerTaylor Janzen - Shouting Matches (2019, 2mm) -B3, Mellotron, WurlitzerEarnhardt - Earnhardt (2019, Self) -recording and mix engineer, production, B3, guitarBad Self Portraits - Amsterdam (2019, Self) -mix engineerJack McLaughlin - Covered In Black (2019, Self) -recording and mix engineer, bassPro Magnum - Knight Speed (2019, Max Trax) -recording and mix engineerBlake Rave - Dreams and Fears (2019, Self) -recording and mix engineer, production, drums, bass, keyboards, guitarThe Wildwoods - Across A Midwest Sky (2019, Self) -recording and mix engineer, productionWrong Pets - Fucked Up b/w We Have To (2018, Max Trax) -recording and mix engineerThe Bruces - Thieves in the Wick (2018, Grapefruit Records) -mix engineer, piano, keyboardsCitizen Electrical - Archive Spinoffs (2018, Gertrude Tapes) -mix engineerWolfie's Just Fine - Perfection, Nevada (2018, Normal Guy) -piano, B3, Wurlitzer, pump organPile - Odds and Ends (2018, Exploding In Sound) -recording and mix engineerDavid Nance Group - Placed and Slightly Pulverized (2018, Trouble In Mind) -mix engineerChy - Atlantica (2018, Capotista) -mix engineerAudrey Edris - All The Bad Things (2018, Self) -recording and mix engineer, drums, bass, keyboards, guitarMr. E & The Stringless Kite - Seeds (2018, Self) -recording engineerThe Ruralists - The Birth Of Birds (2018, Self) -mix engineerLittle Brazil - Send The Wolves (2018, Max Trax Records) -recording and mix engineerBen Eisenberger - Three Islands (2018, Self) -mix engineerStaffers - Torn Between Two Loves (2018, Unread Records) -mix engineerAnna McClellan - Yes and No (2018, Father/Daughter Records) -production, recording and mix engineer, bass, B3, guitarHigh Up - You Are Here (2017, Team Love Records) -B3, Clavinet, pianoRefrigerator - High Desert Lows (2017, Shrimper Records) -mix engineerThe Wildwoods - Birdie and Gose (2017, Self) -recording and mix engineerThe Lupines - Mountain of Love (2017, Self) -recording and mix engineerThe Wildwoods - Sweet Nostalgia (2017, Self) -recording and mix engineer, production, B3, guitarN.W. Engbers - The Inner World (2017, Self) -recording and mix engineer, production, B3, guitarsBell Mine - Bell Mine (2017, Self) -mix engineerSimon Joyner - Step Into The Earthquake (2017, Shrimper Records) -recording and mix engineer, Mellotron, vocalDavid Nance - Do The Negative Boogie (2017, Ba Da Bing Records) -recording and mix engineer, RhodesJustin Townes Earle - Kids In The Street (2017, New West Records) -piano, B3, Wurlitzer, Clavinet, vibraphone, percussionSee Through Dresses - Horse Of The Other World (2017, Tiny Engines) -recording engineerPile - A Hairshirt of Purpose (2017, Exploding In Sound) -recording and mix engineerTim Kasher - No Resolution (2017, 15 Passenger Records) -recording engineer, mix engineerHigh Up - High Up (2017, Team Love Records) -recording and mix engineerRake Kash - Rake Kash (2016, Gertrude Tapes) -mix engineerMiwi La Lupa - Beginner's Guide (2016, Tiger Shrimp) -recording engineer, piano, Rhodes, vibraphoneConor Oberst - Tachycardia b/w Afterthought (2016, Nonesuch Records) -recording engineerTimecat - Through The Roof (2016, Self) -recording and mix engineerBazile Mills - Where We Are (2016, Self) -recording and mix engineerConor Oberst - Ruminations (2016, Nonesuch Records) -recording engineerPro Magnum - Desinfactar (2016, Self) -recording and mix engineer, B3Oquoa - In Oneir (2016, Self) -recording and mix engineerJump The Tiger - Nightlife (2016, Self) -recording and mix engineerSimon Joyner & The Ghosts - Why Don't You Come Back Around (2016, Ricordo) -recording and mix engineerJoseph - I'm Alone, No You're Not (2016, ATO Records) -piano, B3, MellotronRuston Kelly - Halloween (2016, Razor and Tie) -piano, B3David Nance - More Than Enough (2016, Ba Da Bing Records) -mix engineerNoah's Ark Was A Spaceship - Three (2016, Self) -recording and mix engineerMiwi La Lupa - Ended Up Making Love (2016, Team Love Records) -recording engineer, Wurlitzer, B3, piano, MellotronSam Martin - Get With The Programmed (2016, Self) -mix engineerKatie Burns - Weighted Balloon (2016, Self) -production, recording and mix engineer, drums, bass, keyboards, guitarConor Oberst - Lean On Me, "Life on Normal Street" (2015, Amazon) -production, recording and mix engineer, drums, bass, electric guitar, B3, vocalsMcCarthy Trenching - More Like It (2015, Sower Records) -recording and mix engineerHigh Up - Two Weeks (single) (2015, Self) -recording and mix engineerOh Lazarus - Good Times (2015, Off Label) -mix engineerSee Through Dresses - End Of Days (2015, Tiny Engines) -mix engineerAnna McClellan - Fire Flames (2015, Majestic Litter) -recording and mix engineer, drums, bass, guitars, keyboards, vibraphonePro Magnum - Pro Magnum (2015, Dom) -recording and mix engineer, B3Falls - Omaha (2015, Verve Records) -assistant engineer, pianoThe Good Life - Everybody's Coming Down (2015, Saddle Creek Records) -recording engineerOrenda Fink - 7” Mighty Mist (2015, Saddle Creek Records) — recording and mix engineer, drums, bass, piano, guitars, vibraphone, samples, vocals, arrangementDesaparecidos - Payola (2015, Epitaph Records) -recording engineerOrenda Fink - Ace of Cups (2015, Saddle Creek Records) -production, recording and mix engineerThe Good Life - Novena On A Nocturn (Demo Tapes) (2015, Saddle Creek Records) -mix engineerIcky Blossoms - Mask (2015, Saddle Creek Records) -assistant engineer, drum editingPile - You're Better Than This (2015, Exploding In Sound) -recording and mix engineerSimon Joyner - Grass, Branch and Bone (2015, Woodsist) -recording and mix engineer, piano, B3, percussionJosh Hoyer - Living By The Minute (2014, Silver Street) -recording and mix engineerJason Mraz - Yes! (2014, Atlantic Records) — assistant engineer, drums, percussion, piano, organOrenda Fink - Blue Dream (2014, Saddle Creek Records) — production, recording and mix engineer, guitars, bass, keyboardsFirst Aid Kit - Stay Gold (2014, Columbia Records) — assistant engineer, piano, organ, vibraphoneConor Oberst - Upside Down Mountain (2014, Nonesuch Records) — vibraphoneKatie Burns - Throw The Flowers Down (2014, Self) — production, recording and mix engineer, guitar, piano, vibraphoneSeahaven (band) - Reverie Lagoon: Music For Escapism Only (2014, Run For Cover Records) — recording and mix engineer, guitar, trumpet, organ, vibraphone, bellsBrad Hoshaw - Funeral Guns (2014, Self) — mix engineerJohn Davis - Spare Parts (2013, Shrimper Records/Riot Act) — recording engineerPRO-MAGNUM - 7" (2013, TBA) — recording and mix engineerSavages - TBA (2013, Matador Records) — recording engineerNews For Lulu - Circles (2014, Urtovox) — recording and mix engineer, guitars, vibraphoneJake Bellows - New Ocean (2013, Saddle Creek Redcords) — recording and mix engineer, drums, guitars, mellotron, Hammond B-3, piano, vocalsJake Bellows - Help [EP] (2013, Majestic Litter) — recording and mix engineer, drums, guitars, keyboards, vocalsOur Fox - Sea Glass (2013, Majestic Litter) — recording and mix engineer, drums, keyboards, guitar, vibraphone, vocalsNoah’s Ark Was A Spaceship - You Need You (2013, Self) — recording engineerMal Madrigal - All The Ghosts (2013, TBA) — drums, bass, vibraphone, Hammond B-3, vocalsTed Stevens Unknown Project - ‘Singles’ (2013, TBA) — mix engineer, guitars, keyboardsLadyfinger (ne) - Errant Forms (2013, Saddle Creek Records) — Hammond B-3, WurlitzerBig Harp - Chain Letters (2013, Saddle Creek Records) — recording engineerUUVVWWZ - The Trusted Language (2013, Saddle Creek Records) — recording engineerChromafrost - The End of Instinct (2013, Death Ray) — recording and mix engineerThe Fucking Party - The Fucking Party (2013, Self) — recording and mix engineerElizabeth Davis - Latitudes (2013, Self) — recording and mix engineer, production, drums, bass, guitars, vibraphone, keysMaria The Mexican - Moon Colored Jade (2013, Self) — mix engineerKatie Burns - You’ll Find Your Way (2013, Self) — recording and mix engineer, production, guitars, vibraphone, piano, percussionCatsMelvin - Houston (2013, Self) — mix engineerTilly and the Wall - Heavy Mood (2012, Team Love Records) — recording engineerAzure Ray - As Above So Below (2012, Saddle Creek Records) — guitar samplesSimon Joyner - Ghosts (2012, Sing, Eunuchs!, Ba Da Bing Records) — mix engineerMcCarthy Trenching - Plays The Piano (2012, Slumber Party) — recording and mix engineerCon Dios - There’s a Beat in Your Cold Black Heart (2012, Self) — recording and mix engineerThe So-So Sailors - Young Hearts (2012, No Dancing) — recording and mix engineer, Hammond B-3Conduits - Conduits (2012, Team Love Records) — recording engineerFirst Aid Kit - The Lion’s Roar (2012, Wichita) — pianoOne Eye White - For Better For Worse (2012, Self) — recording and mix engineerDirty Fluorescents - Cut The Line (2012, Self) — recording and mix engineer, masteringCustom Catacombs - Self-Titled (2012, TBA) — recording engineerMcCarthy Trenching - Fresh Blood (2011, Slumber Party) — recording and mix engineerMan Man - Life Fantastic (2011, Anti Records) — assistant engineerThe Bruces - (TBA) — marimbaBright Eyes - The People’s Key (2011, Saddle Creek Records) — assistant engineerKevin Pike/John Kotchian - Pulse/Flow (2011, Bocca Lupo) — masteringFilm Streams - Silents in Concert Series (various) — composition and arrangement, piano, guitars, tape loops, sound reinforcementBefore the Toast and Tea - Methods of the Mad (2010, Bocca Lupo) — composition and arrangement, recording/mixing, mastering, drums, guitars, keyboards, bass, vocals, vibraphone, percussionOrenda Fink - Ask The Night (2009, Saddle Creek Records) — upright bass, pump organMal Madrigal - From The Fingers of Trees (2009, Bocca Lupo) — drums, organ, vibraphone, feedbackPete Yorn - Back and Forth (2009, Columbia Records) — organs, piano, vibraphoneSon Ambulance - Someone Else’s Déja Vu (2008, Saddle Creek Records) — vibraphoneMal Madrigal - The Road is Glue (2007, Bocca Lupo) — vibraphone, drumsMal Madrigal - Life Among The Animals (2007, Bocca Lupo) — vibraphone, drums, Rhodes''

References

Living people
Musicians from Omaha, Nebraska
1979 births